Elliott Godfrey (born 22 February 1983) is a Canadian soccer player who plays for Kings Langley, on loan from Wealdstone.

Club career

Watford

Godfrey spent most of his young life in the UK, and came through the Watford youth and reserve setup.

He made his singular professional appearance for Watford on 4 March 2003, coming on as an 86th-minute substitute in a 1–0 home defeat to Preston North End. After his release from Watford on 11 May 2004, Hampton & Richmond Borough offered him a contract. Whilst at Watford he played for the Canadian under-21 squad.

Hampton & Richmond Borough

Godfrey signed a one-year contract with Hampton & Richmond Borough in August 2004, but did not  appear in a game until a home match in October 2004 against Windsor & Eton in the Isthmian League Premier Division, where he came off the bench to score the winner in a 2–1 victory for his new club.

He signed contracts for the following two seasons and was contracted with Hampton until summer 2008.

AFC Wimbledon

Godfrey was signed by AFC Wimbledon manager Terry Brown on 24 June 2008 from local rivals Hampton & Richmond, scoring his first goal in the second league game of the season, a 2–1 win against Thurrock and helping them gain promotion to Conference National in his first season. Godfrey was released by AFC Wimbledon on 26 April 2010.

Staines Town

In March 2010 Godfrey was loaned to [Staines Town and made his debut on 13 March in a 3:0 win over Woking F.C.

Boreham Wood
Godfrey joined Boreham Wood in May 2010.

Hendon
In August 2011, Godfrey joined Hendon.

Staines Town
In June 2012, Godfrey returned to Staines Town in a move back to the Conference South.

Wealdstone
On 31 January 2013, Godfrey signed on a free transfer for Isthmian League Premier Division team Wealdstone.

St. Albans City 
In April 2013 signed a loan contract with St. Albans City and played his debut on 14 April, in a 4–3 loss to Chippenham Town.

Cheshunt
On 17 September 2017 Godfrey signed for Cheshunt on loan. He played his debut for Cheshunt, in a 2–0 win over Waltham Abbey.

Kings Langley
On 7 November 2017 he dual registered with Kings Langley, making his debut four days later against Weymouth.

International career
He has represented Canada at youth level and made 8 appearances for the U-20 team and 3 for the U-23 team.

References

External links

1983 births
AFC Wimbledon players
Association football forwards
Boreham Wood F.C. players
Canada men's under-23 international soccer players
Canada men's youth international soccer players
Canadian soccer players
Canadian expatriate soccer players
English people of Canadian descent
National League (English football) players
Hampton & Richmond Borough F.C. players
Hendon F.C. players
Isthmian League players
Living people
Soccer players from Toronto
English Football League players
Watford F.C. players
Wealdstone F.C. players
Kings Langley F.C. players
Cheshunt F.C. players
Canadian expatriate sportspeople in England